This is a gallery of curves used in mathematics, by Wikipedia page. See also list of curves.

Algebraic curves

Rational curves

Degree 1

Degree 2

Degree 3

Degree 4

Degree 5

Degree 6

Families of variable degree

Curves of genus one

Curves with genus greater than one

Curve families with variable genus

Transcendental curves

Spirals

Piecewise constructions

Fractal curves

External links
 Visual Dictionary of Special Plane Curves

Image galleries